Al Nahyan is an Arabic language word. It can refer to:

Al Nahyan family
Al Nahyan neighbourhood in Abu Dhabi
Al Nahyan Stadium in the above area